Apsley House is a 19th-century house in Swindon, England, standing on the north side of Bath Road in what is now known as the Old Town.

It was built c.1830–1840 and faced in ashlar Bath stone. The house has two storeys at the front and three at the rear; a modernist extension was added to the right in the late 20th century. The house was for a long time the home and business headquarters of the Toomer family, who ran a local coke and coal business. From 1930 until 2021 it housed the Swindon Museum and Art Gallery but the museum vacated the building and the house was put on sale when its owners, Swindon Borough Council, decided it was no longer suitable and required major repairs.

Apsley House was designated as Grade II listed in 1951.

References

Buildings and structures in Swindon
Grade II listed buildings in Wiltshire
Grade II listed houses
Houses completed in 1840